This article deals with the system of transport in Bihar, both public and private.

Road transport
Also. Bihar has   of proposed Expressways.

Expressways

National Highways

State Highways

Rail transport 

The railway network in Bihar is excellent and provides first-rate citizen centric railway services to the people. Most of the cities have a railway junction that facilitates railway travel across the state. You can easily travel from one part of the state to the other by trains.

Urban Rail 

 Patna Metro - Under construction 
Patna Monorail - Proposed 
Patna tram - defunct since 1903

Water transport

Bihar is connected by National Waterways No. 1 which established in October 1986. This National Waterways has  fixed terminals at Haldia, BISN (Kolkata), Pakur, Farrakka and Patna. This National Waterways has also floating terminals facilities at Haldia, Kolkata, Diamond Harbour, Katwa, Tribeni, Baharampur, Jangipur, Bhagalpur, Semaria, Doriganj, Ballia, Ghazipur, Varanasi, Chunar and Allahabad.

Air transport

Patna airport is well connected to cities like Delhi, Mumbai, Kolkata, Bangalore and many other cities in India. It is categorized as a restricted international airport, with customs facilities to receive international chartered flights. Gaya Airport, is Bihar's only international airport and offers seasonal flights that connect the city to Thailand, Bhutan, and Myanmar. Airlines like IndiGo, SpiceJet, Air India, and Vistara connect various airports in Bihar to cities across India. Darbhanga Airport is another domestic airport in Bihar which is connected with various cities across India. The Darbhanga Airport was built as civil enclave. 

  The airport usually serves domestic flights only, but the city being a pilgrimage city, the airport operates seasonal flights to international destinations.
  The airport is classified as a restricted international airport due to its short runway and serves only domestic flights.

See also 

 Ministry of Transport (Bihar)
 Transport in India
 Indian Railways
 National Highways
 List of National Highways in India
 List of airports in India
 List of railway stations in India
 Bridges in Bihar

References